Lost Years may refer to:

 Lost Years (film), a 1911 silent film dramatic short
 Lost Years: A People's Struggle for Justice, a 2011 documentary
 Lost Years of Merlin series, a novel series by T. A. Barron
 Unknown years of Jesus, a period in the life of Jesus

See also
 Lost Decade (disambiguation)